The Little Yaquina River is a minor tributary of the Yaquina River in Benton and Lincoln counties in the U.S. state of Oregon. It begins in the Central Oregon Coast Range on the eastern side of the border between the two counties but crosses immediately west into Lincoln County through which it flows generally south to meet the main stem near Hamar Lake, north of Nashville. The Little Yaquina has one named tributary, Cedar Creek, which enters from the right.

See also
 List of rivers of Oregon

References

Rivers of Oregon
Rivers of Benton County, Oregon
Rivers of Lincoln County, Oregon